is a 2005 Japanese anthology film consisting of four segments based on works by Edogawa Ranpo.

Synopsis

Mars Canal
A story told without speaking. It tells the story of a naked man who wanders through a depressing and desolate landscape recalling memories of his former lover.

Mirror Hell
The story revolves around Ranpo's fictional detective Kogoro Akechi (played Tadanobu Asano), as he tries to find out why several women are being found dead with burnt faces and charred skulls. During his investigation he finds an odd hand mirror at the scene that starts unraveling the mystery.

Caterpillar
A war hero returns home with severe injuries. He is deaf with no limbs and only his eyesight remaining. His beautiful wife, tired of taking care of him, turns to torturing him for her amusement.

Crawling Bugs
An actress is returning home from a successful night on stage, until her limo driver decides that she should be coming home with him.

External links

2005 films
2000s Japanese-language films
2005 horror films
Japanese horror anthology films
Films based on Japanese novels
Films based on horror novels
Films based on works by Edogawa Ranpo
Horror anthologies
2000s Japanese films